Catholic Telecommunications Network of America was an American Catholic television network that existed from  1982 to 1994. It was sponsored by the National Conference of Catholic Bishops, which spent $30 million on the network.  The network's failure has been explained by its being  “unable to adapt quickly to its environment.” It has been called "a mistake the church doesn't want to repeat". Its competitor, EWTN, which also started up in the early 1980s, went on to become reportedly "the world’s largest religious media network".

Reference

Television channels and stations established in 1982